Nilüfer is a district of the Bursa Province of Turkey, established in 1987. It is one of the seventeen districts of Bursa Province. It is established as the main residential development area of Bursa in order to meet the housing needs as well as industrial and commercial structures.

Name origin
The name of the district comes from Nilüfer River that passes through the district. Besides that also the name of the river comes from Nilüfer Hatun. According to traditional stories, Nilüfer Hatun ordered the building of a bridge over a river in Bursa and after the completion of bridge, both the river and the bridge were named "Nilüfer".

History
Nilüfer district hosting the first settlement in Bursa Region as per some researchers, bears the traces of both Byzantine and Ottoman and the older periods in history. In Nilüfer; Tepecik Tumulus, Gölyazı and Tahtalı villages in Alaaddinbey Neighborhood and Aktopraklık Tumulus and Gölyazı islands region in Akçalar district are rich in historical findings. There are ruins of churches, mosques, baths, fountains, monasteries and castles in these regions together with historical remains and monument trees.

There are many historical structures scattered in different parts of Nilüfer. Mosques, bridges and baths from Ottoman region and church ruins remained from various times. Some of them are: H. Ioannes Theologos Church in Çatalağıl village, Saint Helena Church in Özlüce Neighborhood, Demirci Mosque, Yaylacık Mosque, Mihraplı Bridge. Also Misi village and Gölyazı district are the richest ancient settlement areas in Nilüfer. The history of the district goes back to 6th century B.C.

Population
Due to being a new residential development area, Nilüfer has a high population growth rate with respect to other places. The population of the district rose%13 in yearly basis between 1990–2000 and%5.6 in yearly basis between 2000 and 2007. The official results of the recent censuses are:

Climate
The weather of district shows characteristics of Marmara climatic region. While, the hottest month of the year is July, the coldest month is February. The rainy weather can be seen mostly in winter and spring time. The annual average precipitation is about 500–700 mm. The humidity in district is about 58% in average.

Industry
Nilüfer comes first among the districts of Bursa in terms of the economical contribution it provides to Turkey. Because, Bursa Organized Industry Area, Nilüfer Organized Industry area and Beşevler Small Industry Site, which provide employment opportunities for a great amount of Bursa population take place within the borders of Nilüfer. There are many other industry areas and business centers in Çalı, Kayapa, Hasanağa, Akçalar and Görükle under the body of Nilüfer. Nilüfer provides employment opportunities to 80% of Bursa population and derives great income for Turkey. The most important sectors within the district are textile, automotive, machine, spare parts and related industry products.

Cultural activities
The cultural activities in district are organized mainly by Nilüfer Municipality. The Municipality provides several hobby and art classes in several activities, such as; drawing, sculpture, acting, photographing, ornament design, ebru, mosaic etc. Also several plays, concerts, exhibitions and conferences are performed every year in culture centers (such as Konak Kültürevi, Uğur Mumcu Sahnesi, and Nâzım Hikmet Kültürevi) of the municipality. In summer time, several open-air public concerts are given by different musicians as a part of two summer festivals organized by Uludag University and Nilüfer Municipality. Also there are several local, traditional festivals held by villagers and other small communities in district. Most of them originate from traditional harvest festivals.

Sports
In 2014, the Minareliçavuş Spor Tesisleri was opened consisting of two football fields. It is home to Yeşil Bursa AŞ playing in the TFF Third League.

Main sights
 Misi Village
 Gölyazı District
 Mihraplı Bridge
 H. Ioannes Theologos Church
 Nilüfer Bridge
 Demirci Mosque
 Uluabat Lake
 Ayvaini Cave
 Saint Helena Church

Twin Cities and Partnerships
Nilüfer Municipality is twinned with;
Ardino, Bulgaria
Braila, Romania
Nizami, Azerbaijan
Mykolayiv, Ukraine
Cerro, Cuba
Tōkai, Aichi, Japan 
Gazimağusa, Northern Cyprus
Umea, Sweden
Kekava, Latvia
Peja, Kosovo
Serres, Greece
Lublin, Poland
Gotse Delchev, Bulgaria
Chalette-sur-Loing, France
Hanau, Germany
Asenovgrad, Bulgaria
Adalar, İstanbul, Turkey
Dinar, Afyon, Turkey
Kırklareli, Turkey
Tuzlukçu, Konya, Turkey
Vezirhan, Bilecik, Turkey
Tut, Adıyaman, Turkey

Nilüfer Municipality has also partnership agreements with;
Balatonfüred, Hungary
Braslav, Belarus
Veria, Greece

References

External links
 Nilüfer Municipality 
 Nilüfer Photos

Populated places in Bursa Province
Districts of Bursa Province